Zoe Dare is a comic book series co-created by writer Brockton McKinney and illustrated and co-created by Andrew Herman and published by Action Lab Comics.

Characters
This list only includes the cast listed in the most recent issue released.
Zoe Dare
Danni Dare
Tarney Winfield

References

Science fiction comics